Osti or OSTI may refer to:

 Office of Scientific and Technical Information, part of the Office of Science within the U.S. Department of Energy
 Ostindustrie, a World War II German industrial project, abbreviated Osti
 Osti (surname)

See also
 Oste (disambiguation)